The secretin receptor is a protein that in humans is encoded by the SCTR gene. This protein is a G protein-coupled receptor which binds secretin and is the leading member (i.e., first cloned) of the class B GPCR subfamily.

Interactions 
The secretin receptor has been shown to interact with pituitary adenylate cyclase activating peptide.

References

Further reading

External links 
IUPHAR GPCR Database - Secretin receptor
 

G protein-coupled receptors